Baysgarth Park is a public park situated in the market town of Barton-upon-Humber, Lincolnshire, England.

The park provides thirty acres of recreational space off Brigg Road to the south of the town. Baysgarth House, located in the park, contains Baysgarth House Museum, which illustrates the history, archaeology, flora and fauna of the district.
Baysgarth Leisure Centre is also located here.

In July 2018 it was awarded a Green Flag Award following a series of renovations.

References

External links
 Barton upon Humber Baysgarth Park, Lincolnshire County Council

Parks and open spaces in Lincolnshire
Barton-upon-Humber